Sarvopari Palakkaran is a 2017 Malayalam film directed by Venugopan. The film features Anoop Menon, Aparna Balamurali and Anu Sithara in the lead roles.

Plot
Jose Kaithaparambil Mani (Anoop Menon) is from Pala but works as a Circle-Inspector of Police in Thrissur. He is engaged to a college-going student Linda (Anu Sithara). Being a man with cultural values, and a traditional type. While his father (Alencier Ley Lopez), who is a bar manager and friend Joymon try to ensure that Linta is the perfect match for Jose.

A Bangladeshi lady, Naina, who was kept in custody and severely molested by Mani Swami, somehow manages to escape and reach the police. Police then starts their hunt for Mani Swami. However, Mani Swami cleverly escapes leaving the black mark on the police. Naina was placed in a shelter home and there she spends her time in painting and writing poems.

Anupama is a social worker and drama artist. C.I Jose happens to see Anupama walking alone to her hostel at midnight 12:30 a.m on the road and stops her. Though she insisted that she will walk to her hostel, Jose stops her. When an auto comes, she refrains to enter the auto citing the reason that the auto driver is a stranger. This enrages Jose and he puts her into police custody. When his sub-ordinates at the police station identifies Anupama as the one who created news during the "Kiss of Love" protest, they suggest Jose to free her, as keeping her in custody will create more problems in the morning. Anupama firmly says that she has to be dropped at the hostel by C.I Jose. When S.I Rameshan persuades, Jose agrees and drops her at her P.G.

Mani Swami again lands in Thrissur, however he attacks and injures a police officer and escapes. Besides running behind Mani Swami, Jose and Anupama meet in various circumstances, and once Jose even takes her into custody for immoral traffic. This became a social issue, and Jose was suspended by ASP Chandra Sivakumar for creating such a problem. He was also taken off from Naina's case. But as time passes by Jose and Anupama become closer. Mani Swami still carries out his process of transporting young girls to other countries.

ASP Chandra Sivakumar calls Jose for a personal meeting at her flat. Jose uses the opportunity to invite her to his wedding with Linta. He was shocked to hear that Anupama has had phone calls with Mani Swami. After being reassigned to Naina's case to trap Mani, Jose follows Anupama to Goa, where he realizes she is meeting with Mani. Anupama talks to Mani and claims she wants in on the prostitution ring, and when they meet later that night, Mani tries to seduce Anupama, only for Anupama to reveal that he is her father. A shocked Mani Swami begs for her forgiveness, as Jose and the police arrive to arrest him. Later, Anupama reveals to Jose that she has feelings for him. She gives him one last hug and boards a bus while Jose, who's still engaged to Linda, stares lovingly as she rides away.

Cast
 Anoop Menon as C.I. Jose Mani Chakko
 Aparna Balamurali as Anupama Neelakanthan
 Anu Sithara as Linta Jose
 Nandhu as Mani Swami
 Gayatri Arun as ASP Chandra Sivakumar IPS
 Vijayakumar
 Chali Pala as S.I. Rameshkumar
 Manju Satheesh 
 Balu Varghese as Joymon
 Alencier Ley Lopez as Mani Chako
 Roshan Basheer
 Manuraj as S. I. Paulose
 Manju Sunichen as Police constable
 Nithin Susheel
 Reneesha Rehman
 Mamitha Baiju as Raji
 Anoop Krishnan as Heroine's friend
 Vindhuja Vikraman
 Sadhika Venugopal as Naina

Production
Anoop Menon signed into play the male lead along with Miya and Honey Rose . Nandhu signed into play the main antagonist role. Television actress Gayathri Arun who is well known for portraying police officer in TV series Parasparam signed into play an important character which is also a police officer role will mark her debut in Malayalam Cinema.

In late 2016, Aparna Balamurali replaced Honey Rose and  Anu Sithara replaced the later citing date issues.

Reception
The Times of India rated the film with 2.5 stars, saying the film doesn’t live up to its premise.

References

External links
 

2010s Malayalam-language films
Films scored by Bijibal